National CleanUp Day is held annually in the United States and globally on the third Saturday of September. In the United States, there are cleanups held in every State and Territory. It promotes country-scale organized and individual cleanup events and volunteering to keep the outdoors clean and prevent plastic from entering the ocean. National CleanUp Day is organized by Clean Trails, a nonprofit organization founded by Bill Willoughby and Steve Jewett.

History
The inaugural National CleanUp Day was held in 2017 and had more than 225,000 volunteers.  The 2018 event had over 1,500,000 volunteers, 14 million pounds of waste collected, and was held in conjunction with the inaugural World Cleanup Day.

The 2019 cleanup received nearly two million volunteers and resulted in the collection of 18 million pounds of waste.  The U.S. event is coordinated with World Cleanup Day and saw a combined 20 million volunteers in 170 countries, which is the largest, single day global volunteer event. Beginning in 2018, the U.S. Department of Transportation participated in cleanups on their local and interstate highway systems.

In April 2019, Earth Day partnered with National CleanUp Day and Keep America Beautiful for the inaugural Earth Day CleanUp and had over 500,000 volunteers working to clean up trash and litter nationally. In 2020, the Great Global CleanUp by Earth Day was originally planned to include thousands of large group cleanups but most events were cancelled as a result of the COVID-19 pandemic. Instead, Earth Day and presenting partners World CleanUp Day, National CleanUp Day and Keep America Beautiful organized individual activities like Plogging and the TrashTag Challenge.

In 2020, National CleanUp Day introduced the Tailored CleanUp program for businesses and cities. The program is available to any participating business, educational institution, land manager, government entity or nonprofit. The Tailored CleanUp page may be used for any cleanup activity on any date in the United States, Canada, India or China. The Join a CleanUp, cleanup mapping pages, and reporting pages may be used for any cleanup worldwide on any date. National CleanUp Day pivoted in 2020 due to COVID-19 from large scale cleanups to individual cleanups. They had over 671,000 signups by individuals, municipalities, schools, and companies.

Events
National Cleanup Month events are held throughout September and include a focus on events on public lands on the fourth Saturday of the month.

National CleanUp Day events are held in the United States, Aruba, Bahamas, Belarus, Bhutan, Canada, China, Dominican Republic, India, Israel, Kenya, Malawi, Namibia, Netherlands, New Zealand, Romania, Rwanda, Sierra Leone, South Africa, Sweden, Switzerland, Taiwan, and the Philippines.

In 2021, National CleanUp Day, World CleanUp Day, and EARTHDAY.ORG partnered to provide organized events together using a common, shared mapping system resulting in  the collection of 145 million pounds of trash. An estimated 12 million people participated in 191 countries.  

In 2022, the mapping system was enhanced using the Esri GIS Hub allowing non-profits, government entities, and partners to directly include their local community cleanup maps to the Global Cleanup Map. The Cleanup Hub is a tool to better support the cleanup movement Thomas Brothers partnered with local organizations like Friends of Lake Sammamish Park and the Forest Park Conservancy for trail cleanups on National Cleanup Day and National Public Lands Day. Keep Nature Wild held cleanups on trails and parks in more than 50 locations in conjunction with WildKeepers and local outdoor retailers.

Media
CleanUp News was launched on September 19, 2020, and contains CleanUp articles for the general readership, science articles, and resources for journalists and writers.  The first of a series of interviews with world leaders was published in June 2021. The interview featured the President of Iceland, Guðni Th. Jóhannesson.

Actor Cobie Smulders joined with Clean Trails and Planet Oat to promote cleanup activities for National CleanUp Day.

See also 
 Clean-up (environment)
 World Cleanup Day
 International Volunteer Day
 Litter in the United States

References

External links 

 Official web-site

External links
 National CleanUp Day

Nature conservation organizations based in the United States
Observances in the United States
September observances
Recurring events established in 2017
Environmental awareness days
Saturday observances
Holidays and observances by scheduling (nth weekday of the month)
Volunteering in the United States
Litter
September events
Volunteer organizations in the United States
Volunteer organizations
Environmental volunteering
Community organizations